Antoine Wehenkel (10 February 1910 – 27 February 1992) was a Luxembourgian politician and engineer.  He was a member of the Luxembourg Socialist Workers' Party (LSAP), of which he was President (1970 – 1974).

Wehenkel was first elected to the Chamber of Deputies in 1951, and would continue to be so until 1974.  Wehenkel withdrew from sitting as a deputy to take his place in the government of Pierre Werner between 1964 and 1969, holding the position of Minister for the Budget and the newly created office of  Minister for the National Economy and Energy.  With the LSAP ejected from government by a shift of coalition in 1969, Wehenkel turned to be President of the Chamber, which he remained until 1974, when he retired from politics.

He was a member of the communal council of Luxembourg City between 1951 and 1964.

|-

|-

|-

Ministers for Energy of Luxembourg
Ministers for the Economy of Luxembourg
Presidents of the Chamber of Deputies (Luxembourg)
Members of the Chamber of Deputies (Luxembourg)
Councillors in Luxembourg City
Luxembourg Socialist Workers' Party politicians
Luxembourgian engineers
Luxembourgian people in rail transport
1910 births
1992 deaths
People from Luxembourg City
Alumni of the Athénée de Luxembourg
20th-century engineers